Darwin Keith Kyle (June 1, 1918 – February 16, 1951) a veteran soldier in the United States Army in World War II, Darwin Kyle earned both a Silver Star and Bronze Star for his heroic actions in France and Germany. A Master Sergeant at the beginning of the Korean War, "Gus" was posthumously awarded the Soldiers Medal for his heroic actions on December 24, 1950, during the final stages of the Hungnam evacuation. 

On January 27, 1951, he received a battlefield commission as a 2nd Lieutenant. He was killed in action on February 16, 1951, and on January 16, 1952, at the Pentagon, his widow accepted the posthumous award of the Medal of Honor for his conspicuous gallantry and intrepidity above and beyond the call of duty.

Kyle joined the Army from Racine, West Virginia, in November 1939.

Medal of Honor citation
Rank and organization: Second Lieutenant, U.S. Army, Company K, 7th Infantry Regiment, 3rd Infantry Division

Place and date: Near Kamil-ni, Korea, February 16, 1951

Entered service at: Racine, W. Va. Born: June 1, 1918, Jenkins, Kentucky

G.O. No.: 17, February 1, 1952

Citation
2d Lt. Kyle, distinguished himself by conspicuous gallantry and intrepidity above and beyond the call of duty in action against the enemy. When his platoon had been pinned down by intense fire, he completely exposed himself to move among and encourage his men to continue the advance against enemy forces strongly entrenched on Hill 185. Inspired by his courageous leadership, the platoon resumed the advance but was again pinned down when an enemy machine gun opened fire, wounding 6 of the men. 2d Lt. Kyle immediately charged the hostile emplacement alone, engaged the crew in hand-to-hand combat, killing all 3. Continuing on toward the objective, his platoon suddenly received an intense automatic-weapons fire from a well-concealed hostile position on its right flank. Again leading his men in a daring bayonet charge against this position, firing his carbine and throwing grenades, 2d Lt. Kyle personally destroyed 4 of the enemy before he was killed by a burst from an enemy submachine gun. The extraordinary heroism and outstanding leadership of 2d Lt. Kyle, and his gallant self-sacrifice, reflect the highest credit upon himself and are in keeping with the esteemed traditions of the military service.

Legacy
The U.S. Army named a camp after 2d Lt. Kyle, Camp Kyle, near Uijeongbu, South Korea.

See also

List of Medal of Honor recipients
List of Korean War Medal of Honor recipients

Notes

References

"Lt. Darwin K. Kyle" Kentucky History

1921 births
1951 deaths
United States Army Medal of Honor recipients
American military personnel killed in the Korean War
Recipients of the Soldier's Medal
Recipients of the Silver Star
Korean War recipients of the Medal of Honor
People from Jenkins, Kentucky
Military personnel from Kentucky
United States Army personnel of World War II
United States Army personnel of the Korean War